T.K. Ubaid is an Islamic writer and editor in Malayalam language. He has authored and translated books including Quran Bodhanam, a commentary to Quran. He is an editor of Islamic Encyclopedia project of Islamic publishing house, Kerala. He also contributed in translating 6 Volume Quran commentary Tafhim-ul-Quran to Malayalam language. As of July 2020, he is an editor of Prabodhanam weekly, and Malarwadi magazine.

Early life
Ubaid was born on 1948 at a village in Ponnani Taluk. Completed his education from Islamiya College, Santhapuram near Perinthalmanna.

Career
Uabaid started his career as sub editor of a kids magazine named Sanmargam from 1972 until he joined Prabodhanam in 1974. He became editor in-charge of Prabodhanam on 1977 and Executive editor in 1987. He also worked as Resident editor of Madhyamam Daily in the period of 1993-1994 at Kochi edition. From 1995, he also worked as a member of editorial board of journal, Bodhanam. Currently he is chief editor of Prabodhanam weekly and Malarwadi kids magazine.

Literary works
Quran bodhanam (8 Volumes released yet)
Adam Havva
Lokasundaran (Story of prophet Yusuf)
Burden of freedom (സ്വാതന്ത്ര്യത്തിന്റെ ഭാരം)
Prasnangngal veekshanangngal
Introduction to Islamic activism
Hadith bodhanam
Allah
Islamic Sharia and social changes (ഇസ്‌ലാമിക ശരീഅത്തും സാമൂഹ്യ മാറ്റങ്ങളും)
Manushya ninte manass

Translations 
Tafhim-ul-Quran (6 Volumes-contribution with other translators) 
Kalila and Dimna (കലീലയും ദിംനയും)
Four Basic Qur’anic Terms (ഖുർആനിലെ നാല് സാങ്കേതിക ശബ്ദങ്ങൾ)
The Meaning of the Qur'an (ഖുർആൻ ഭാഷ്യം)
Fiqhussunna

References

1948 births
Living people
Malayalam-language writers